Malcolm Harry Erskine, 17th Earl of Buchan (4 July 1930 – 11 September 2022) was a Scottish landowner and peer, a member of the House of Lords from 1984 until the House of Lords Act 1999 removed most hereditary peers.

The younger son of Donald Cardross Flower Erskine, 16th Earl of Buchan, and his wife Christina Baxendale, he became his father’s heir due to the death of his brother David Stuart Erskine (1928–1933) in childhood. He was educated at Eton College and was styled as Lord Cardross between 1960 and 1984, when he succeeded as the Earl of Buchan (1469), Lord Auchterhouse (1469), Lord Cardross (1610) and Baron Erskine of Restormel Castle (1806). The last of these was in the Peerage of the United Kingdom, the others in that of Scotland.

In 1972, as Lord Cardross, Buchan became a Justice of the Peace for Westminster and was also a Liveryman of the Worshipful Company of Grocers.

On 21 February 1957, Buchan married Hilary Diana Cecil Power, a daughter of Sir Ivan Power, 2nd Baronet, and his first wife Nancy Hilary Griffiths, and they had four children:

Henry Thomas Alexander Erskine, 18th Earl of Buchan (born 1960)
Lady Seraphina Mary Erskine (born 1961)
Hon. Montagu John Erskine (born 1966)
Lady Arabella Fleur Erskine (born 1969)

In 2003, Buchan was living at Newnham House, Newnham, Hampshire. He died on 11 September 2022, at the age of 92.

Notes

Family tree

1930 births
2022 deaths
Malcolm
People educated at Eton College
Buchan